Víctor Campuzano Bonilla (born 31 May 1997) is a Spanish professional footballer who plays as a forward for Sporting de Gijón.

Club career
Born in Barcelona, Catalonia, Campuzano joined RCD Espanyol's youth setup in 2011, from EF Gavà. On 17 May 2016, after finishing his formation, he signed a three-year contract with Real Madrid and was assigned to the reserves in Segunda División B.

Campuzano made his senior debut on 8 October 2016, coming on as a second-half substitute for Francisco Tena in a 0–1 away loss against CD Toledo. He scored his first goal on 11 December, netting his team's first in a 2–2 draw at CD Mensajero.

On 13 July 2018, Campuzano returned to Espanyol after agreeing to a one-year deal, and was assigned to the B-team also in the third division. He made his first team debut on 15 August of the following year, starting and scoring a brace in a 3–0 win against FC Luzern in the UEFA Europa League.

Campuzano made his La Liga debut on 18 August 2019, replacing Wu Lei in a 0–2 home loss against Sevilla FC. Despite scoring five times in the Europa League for the club, he failed to score in 20 league appearances during the campaign, as his side suffered relegation.

On 1 February 2021, after featuring rarely, Campuzano terminated his contract with the Pericos and moved to fellow Segunda División side Sporting de Gijón on a four-and-a-half-year deal just hours later.

References

External links
Real Madrid profile

1997 births
Living people
Footballers from Barcelona
Spanish footballers
Association football forwards
La Liga players
Segunda División players
Segunda División B players
Real Madrid Castilla footballers
RCD Espanyol B footballers
RCD Espanyol footballers
Sporting de Gijón players
Spain youth international footballers